Notre-Dame-du-Lac may refer to:

 Notre-Dame-du-Lac, Quebec, a former city that is now part of Témiscouata-sur-le-Lac
 Notre-Dame-du-Lac Church in Le Thor, Vaucluse, France
 Abbey of Notre-Dame du Lac (Oka, Quebec) in Oka, Quebec
 University of Notre Dame du Lac, full name